Stories and Songs: The Adventures of Captain Feathersword the Friendly Pirate is The Wiggles' third album, released in 1993. This album is about The Wiggles meeting and going on an adventure with Captain Feathersword and his pirate mates to find a treasure chest that he buried on an island years ago, and after that they celebrate his birthday.

Plot
The Wiggles get to meet Captain Feathersword and his pirate mates as when they all go on adventure to find treasure. First of all, they have to go through a huge storm as when they go across the ocean. After the storm, they arrived safe on the island. Then they began to look for the treasure around the island for the treasure that Captain Feathersword buried years ago. When they dogged and found the treasure, they all noticed that they found baked beans. Captain Feathersword remembered that he buried baked beans for them to eat. As when they left the island, it was also Captain Feathersword's birthday and the pirate mates were playing a trick on the Captain. Little while later, they gave the Captain a surprise as when he entered the room and he said that it was the best birthday that he ever had and then the pirate mates sing a birthday song to him.

Track listing
All stories and songs composed and written by the Wiggles - J. Fatt, A. Field, M. Cook, G. Page

Personnel
Per booklet.
 All male voices: Jeff Fatt, Anthony Field, Murray Cook, Greg Page
 Penelope's voice: Vanessa Fallon-Rohanna

 Produced and Engineered by: the Wiggles
 Photography: Jeff Fatt
 Artwork: Lynne Trevall
 Cover design and illustration: Franciscus Henri

References

The Wiggles albums
1993 albums